Season 2022–23 is for FC Chernihiv's 1st season in Ukrainian First League in its history. Due to the ruin of the Chernihiv Arena, the club decided to use the stadium Yunist Stadium, located in the city center of Chernihiv.

Players

Squad information

Transfers

In

Out

Pre-season and friendlies

Competitions

Overall record

Results by round

Ukrainian First League

Group B league table

Results

Ukrainian Cup

Statistics

Appearances and goals 

|-
! colspan=16 style=background:#dcdcdc; text-align:center| Goalkeepers

 
|-
! colspan=17 style=background:#dcdcdc; text-align:center| Defenders

 

|-
! colspan=16 style=background:#dcdcdc; text-align:center| Midfielders 

 

 	

|-
! colspan=16 style=background:#dcdcdc; text-align:center| Forwards

|-
! colspan=16 style=background:#dcdcdc; text-align:center| Players transferred out during the season

Last updated: 27 November 2022

Disciplinary record

Last updated: 27 November 2022

Goalscorers

Last updated: 27 November 2022

Clean sheets

Last updated: 27 November 2022

References

External links 

 

FC Chernihiv
FC Chernihiv seasons
FC Chernihiv